Hart Township is an inactive township in Wright County, in the U.S. state of Missouri.

Hart Township was erected in 1841, taking its name from Isaac Hart, a pioneer citizen.

References

Townships in Missouri
Townships in Wright County, Missouri